Michael Shane Meredith (born September 22, 1967 in Dallas, Texas) is an American independent film director, screenwriter and producer. He frequently collaborates with German director Wim Wenders. Meredith is the son of the late former Dallas Cowboys quarterback and football commentator Don Meredith. He was the oldest of two children from Don Meredith's second marriage to the artist Cheryl King.

Background
Meredith was born at Baylor Hospital in Dallas on September 22, 1967. He is married to Amit Nizan Meredith who is the mother of his children as well as his business partner. His film work includes Wim Wenders' Land of Plenty for which he co-wrote. He also wrote and directed Three Days of Rain and The Open Road.

He founded Maximon Pictures, a production company which has produced work that has won awards. The company is said to be named after the patron saint of good times and good luck.

Career

Film
Meredith's first feature film was Three Days of Rain, which starred Peter Falk, Blythe Danner, Lyle Lovett, Jason Patric and Don Meredith. Wim Wenders was also involved with the film.

In 2006, Meredith wrote the screenplay for Wenders' Land of Plenty, which earned an Independent Spirit Award nomination for Michelle Williams.

Meredith wrote and directed The Open Road, starring Jeff Bridges, Justin Timberlake, Kate Mara, and Mary Steenburgen. Wenders was executive producer and Charlie Sexton did the score for the film.

In 2014, Alex Gibney and Wim Wenders partnered with Meredith to make a documentary feature, "Return To Timbuktu", centered on the efforts of Malian musicians trying to restore peace in the war torn Sahara. , IMDb, AllMovie, Variety Insight and other online film databases show that this film has not moved forward.

Other work
Meredith served as producer, director and narrator of the Ice Bowl episode for NFL Films series The Timeline. The one-hour episode examines the historic game played between the Packers and Cowboys for the 1967 NFL Championship. The one-hour show features Meredith's journey over four years and nine states to interview surviving members of the Ice Bowl, and to understand more about the game's legacy and significance 50 years after it took place. The Ice Bowl features interviews with players such as Bart Starr, Jerry Kramer, Dave Robinson, Mel Renfro, Pettis Norman, Chuck Mercein, Lance Rentzel and Donny Anderson, former Cowboys Director of Player Personnel Gil Brandt, Cowboys broadcaster Bill Mercer, Meredith's former spouse Cheryl King, and more.

In 2017, it was announced that Meredith was producing and directing a documentary film titled "First Cowboys" on the origins of the Dallas Cowboys. Roger Staubach, Walt Garrison, Mel Renfro, Pettis Norman Gary Cartwright, Rayfield Wright, and Ralph Neely, among others, were featured. Willie Nelson and Alicia Landry, wife of the late Coach Tom Landry, were to make appearances. , IMDb, AllMovie, Variety Insight and other online film databases show that this film has not moved forward.

Filmography

References

Further reading
 New York Times: Michael Meredith filmography
 Land of Plenty
 Sports Illustrated: Merry Christmas, NFC: The No. 1 Seed Eagles Suddenly Look Very Beatable
 Guide Live This terrific Ice Bowl documentary is one every Dallas Cowboys fan needs to see
 Green Bay Press Gazette Documentary examines Ice Bowl's impact from both sides

External links
 
 
 
 Maximon Pictures 
 New York Times Review of Three Days of Rain (subscription required)
 Ebert Review of Three Days of Rain 

1967 births
Living people
People from Dallas
American male screenwriters
Film producers from Texas
Alumni of the London Academy of Music and Dramatic Art
Film directors from Texas
Screenwriters from Texas